The 2022 FIFA World Cup qualification UEFA Group B was one of the ten UEFA groups in the World Cup qualification tournament to decide which teams would qualify for the 2022 FIFA World Cup finals tournament in Qatar. Group B consisted of five teams: Georgia, Greece, Kosovo, Spain and Sweden. The teams played against each other home-and-away in a round-robin format.

The group winners, Spain, qualified directly for the World Cup finals, while the runners-up, Sweden, advanced to the second round (play-offs).

Greece, Georgia and Spain did not recognize Kosovo as an independent country, and therefore, during the match between Spain and Kosovo, the latter team was named "Kosovo Football Federation".

Standings

Matches
The fixture list was confirmed by UEFA on 8 December 2020, the day following the draw. Times are CET/CEST, as listed by UEFA (local times, if different, are in parentheses).

Goalscorers

Discipline
A player was automatically suspended for the next match for the following offences:
 Receiving a red card (red card suspensions could be extended for serious offences)
 Receiving two yellow cards in two different matches (yellow card suspensions were carried forward to the play-offs, but not the finals or any other future international matches)
The following suspensions were served during the qualifying matches:

Notes

References

External links

Qualifiers – Europe, FIFA.com
European Qualifiers, UEFA.com

Group B
2021 in Georgian football
2020–21 in Greek football
2021–22 in Greek football
2020–21 in Kosovan football
2021–22 in Kosovan football
2020–21 in Spanish football
2021–22 in Spanish football
Spain at the 2022 FIFA World Cup
2021 in Swedish football